The 1998 Pepsi 400 was a NASCAR Winston Cup Series stock car race held on October 17, 1998, at Daytona International Speedway in Daytona Beach, Florida. Originally scheduled to be held on the Fourth of July, the race was postponed until the fall due to widespread wildfires in central Florida; it was the first superspeedway race to be held at night, and the first time (and, as of 2022, the only time) there were two consecutive points-paying restrictor plate races, with the Winston 500 being run first on October 11.

Contested over 160 laps, it was the thirtieth race of the 1998 season. Jeff Gordon of Hendrick Motorsports took his eleventh win of the season, while Bobby Labonte finished second and Mike Skinner finished third. Gordon retained his point lead on the way to his third Winston Cup championship title.

Report

Background 

Daytona International Speedway is one of six superspeedways to hold NASCAR races, the others being Michigan International Speedway, California Speedway, Indianapolis Motor Speedway, Pocono Raceway and Talladega Superspeedway. The track's turns are banked at 31 degrees, while the front stretch, the location of the finish line, is banked at 18 degrees. John Andretti was the defending race winner. The event was the fifth of five night races held during the 1998 Winston Cup Series season.

The 1998 Pepsi 400 was originally scheduled to be run on July 4, 1998, as the seventeenth race of the 33-event Winston Cup Series schedule. It was the first superspeedway race, and first NASCAR event held at Daytona, to be run at night following the installation of Musco lighting at the Daytona International Speedway; it was also scheduled to be broadcast live on CBS, the first stock car event to be televised live on primetime network television.

During the days leading up to the scheduled start of practice at 3pm, Thursday, July 2, 1998, concerns rose on account of the massive wildfire outbreak that was underway in central Florida; thousands of people were forced to evacuate the area, and Interstate 95, the primary north–south thoroughfare through the region, was closed. At 10am on July 2, NASCAR announced that the race was being postponed; while July 25 was an open date, the decision was made to reschedule the race for October 17, to allow additional time for the wildfires to be controlled. At the time of the postponement, the race was sold out; this was the first time the summer race at Daytona International Speedway had achieved sellout status.

The rescheduling meant that the race would not be televised on CBS, as the network did not want to compete against Fox's broadcast of Game 1 of the Major League Baseball World Series, also scheduled for October 17. On July 21, it was announced that The Nashville Network, a cable affiliate of CBS, would air the rescheduled race live in its entirety.

Prior to the race, Jeff Gordon led the Drivers' Championship with 4632 points, and Mark Martin was in second with 4344 points. Dale Jarrett was third in the Drivers' Championship with 4098 points, Rusty Wallace was fourth with 3883 points, and Jeff Burton was in fifth with 3805 points. In the Manufacturers' Championship, Chevrolet was tied with Ford for the lead with 216 points each; Pontiac followed in third with 138 points.

Practice and qualifying 
Practice and first round qualifying was held on Thursday, October 15, 1998; Bobby Labonte led pre-qualifying practice with a lap time of 46.722 seconds. Five Ford teams, those of drivers Chad Little, Jimmy Spencer, Rich Bickle, Dick Trickle and Billy Standridge, ran Thunderbird-bodied race cars, instead of the standard Taurus ran at most 1998 Winston Cup Series races, believing the Thunderbird to have an aerodynamic advantage at the restrictor plate racetracks. ARCA driver Randal Ritter's car failed to pass inspection due to extreme irregularities in its construction, and the team withdrew before practice began.

Bobby Labonte posted the fastest time in first round qualifying, a lap of 46.485 seconds, winning the Bud Pole Award; Jeff Burton was second fastest. Jeremy Mayfield qualified 25th, the last car to qualify for the race on the first day of time trials. Bobby Hamilton, Jimmy Spencer, Ricky Craven, Johnny Benson Jr., Ricky Rudd, Kyle Petty and Darrell Waltrip received provisional starting positions; Rick Mast, Dick Trickle, Rick Wilson, Robert Pressley and Gary Bradberry failed to make the field for the event.

Ernie Irvan, 14th in Winston Cup Series points entering the event, opted to sit out the majority of practice and qualifying, having suffered injuries in a crash the previous week at Talladega Superspeedway; Ricky Craven practiced and qualified the No. 36 Pontiac for Irvan. Irvan did run a few laps during practice on Friday night, October 16; the "Happy Hour" practice session began at 7:30pm and was scheduled to run for two and a half hours, but was delayed during its duration for an hour and 45 minutes, as the track was dried following afternoon thunderstorms. Bobby Hamilton posted the fastest speed in the session, . Johnny Benson's car suffered a hood failure during the session, the hood flying off of the car.

Race 

The race was held starting at 8pm on Saturday, October 17, 1998. Ernie Irvan dropped to the rear of the field prior to the start of the race, due to a driver change; Ricky Craven had qualified the car. Although Bobby Labonte started on pole, Dale Jarrett, who had started third, led the first lap of the race; Dale Earnhardt took the lead on lap two and held it through the first caution period of the race, for rain, for three laps starting at lap 13. A large crash occurred on lap 32; initiated by Kevin Lepage losing control of his car in turn two, the wreck collected eleven cars, including Hut Stricklin, Geoff Bodine and three-time Winston Cup champion Darrell Waltrip; Earnhardt lost the lead during pit stops under caution to Rusty Wallace, with Dave Marcis pitting a lap later than the leaders to pick up five bonus points for leading a lap. Lepage suffered a fractured shoulder in a fall exiting his car.

The race resumed on lap 39; after Earnhardt took the lead for one lap at lap 44 Jarrett assumed the lead and held it for the next 37 laps, until pit stops shuffled the field and saw Earnhardt, Jeff Gordon, and Bobby Labonte swapping the lead among themselves. Jimmy Spencer and Jeremy Mayfield each also led a single lap during the long green-flag period that ended on lap 107 when Dan Pardus hit the wall in turn two. Gordon had been leading at the time of the caution; he lost the lead to rookie Kenny Irwin Jr. during pit stops, and Irwin retained the lead after the resumption of racing on lap 110, leading 15 laps in total until being passed by Gordon on lap 123 on account of having a flat tire, just before the caution came out once again for a rain shower.

The brief four-lap caution saw Gordon retaining the lead; he continued to pace the field as Irwin, on lap 141, hit the Thunderbird of Chad Little, setting off a nine-car accident that brought out a caution. Gordon continued to lead on the restart, and on lap 155, five laps from the finish of the event, rain began to fall once again; the caution flag was thrown, then the red flag, stopping the race to allow the track to be dried and the event to finish under green.

After a 37-minute red flag period, the race resumed; Gordon was able to hold off his challengers over the final three laps to take his eleventh win of the season. In the midst of the final sprint, Chad Little ended up getting turned from behind by Jimmy Spencer while in a three wide battle exiting turn 4 and crashed hard into the inside wall, failing to make it to the stripe and finishing 20th. Gordon set an average speed of  while leading 49 of the race's 160 laps. Gordon received $184,325 in purse money. Bobby Labonte finished second; Mike Skinner was third, while Jeremy Mayfield and Rusty Wallace finished in the top five.

Gordon, who had entered the race with the points lead, extended it to 358 points over Mark Martin; nobody would challenge Gordon over the remainder of the season, and he would go on to win his third Winston Cup Series championship; he was the youngest driver to accomplish the feat. The race took two hours, forty-six minutes, and two seconds to complete, and the margin of victory was 0.176 seconds.

Statistical notes 
The 1998 Pepsi 400 was the only Winston Cup Series start by Dan Pardus, and the last by Billy Standridge. It was also the last race for which Rick Wilson attempted to qualify.

The Pepsi 400 would return to its traditional July date in 1999, and has been held at night every year since the 1998 event, except in 2014, 2019 and 2022 when it was postponed to Sunday due to rain, until 2020, when the date was changed to August 29th.

Results

Qualifying

Race results

References 

Pepsi 400
Pepsi 400
NASCAR races at Daytona International Speedway